Olof Gunnar Olsson (19 July 1908 – 27 September 1974) was a Swedish football forward who played for Sweden in the 1934 FIFA World Cup. He also played for GAIS.

References

External links
FIFA profile

1908 births
1974 deaths
Swedish footballers
Sweden international footballers
Association football forwards
GAIS players
Allsvenskan players
1934 FIFA World Cup players